Imperial 400 was an American motel chain. It was founded in 1959 by Bernard Whitney in Los Angeles, California. Its properties were typically two-story buildings with "gull wing" shaped roofs over the lobby. It was a limited-service hotel chain, competing mainly with Travelodge.

In 1965, Imperial 400 filed for Chapter 11 bankruptcy. Its headquarters were moved to Englewood Cliffs, New Jersey, and again to Arlington, Virginia. By the 1980s, the chain was sold to Interpart S.A., a Luxembourg-based company, and was later dissolved. Imperial 400 structures still exist but usually rundown motels, with exception of a few.  In Richland, WA a former Imperial is boarded and set to be demolished for new apartments.

See also
 List of motels

References

Motels in the United States
Defunct hotel chains
Defunct companies based in California
Hotels established in 1959
Hotels disestablished in 1987
1959 establishments in California
1987 disestablishments in California
Companies that filed for Chapter 11 bankruptcy in 1965